Blainvillia is a genus of picture-winged flies in the family Ulidiidae.

Species
 B. palpata

References

Ulidiidae